Puerto Rico competed at the 2019 World Aquatics Championships in Gwangju, South Korea from 12 to 28 July.

Diving

Puerto Rico entered one diver.

Men

Swimming

Puerto Rico entered five swimmers.

Men

Women

References

Nations at the 2019 World Aquatics Championships
Puerto Rico at the World Aquatics Championships
2019 in Puerto Rican sports